Hueneme Glacier is a glacier,  long, draining westward from the Wisconsin Range in Antarctica to enter Reedy Glacier between Griffith Peak and Mickler Spur. It was mapped by the United States Geological Survey from surveys and U.S. Navy air photos, 1960–64, and was named by the Advisory Committee on Antarctic Names for Port Hueneme, California, the location of the Construction Battalion Center which handled west coast cargo for U.S. Navy Deep Freeze Operations.

References

Glaciers of Marie Byrd Land